Charles Edward Rushmore (December 2, 1857 – October 31, 1931) was an American businessman and attorney for whom Mount Rushmore is named.

Born in New York City, he was the son of Edward Carman Rushmore and Mary Eliza (née Dunn) Rushmore, of Tuxedo Park, New York.  

In 1885 Rushmore came to the Black Hills of South Dakota to check the titles to properties for an eastern mining company owned by James Wilson  following the 1883 opening of the Etta tin mine. How Mount Rushmore came to be named after Charles is subject to contradictory recounting, but the United States Board of Geographic Names officially recognized the name in June 1930, five years after Rushmore donated $5,000 towards Gutzon Borglum's sculpture. The memorial was dedicated by President Calvin Coolidge on August 10, 1927.

Rushmore was a member of the Phi Gamma Delta fraternity and a Freemason. He was married to Jeanette E. Carpenter.

Notes and references 

1857 births
1931 deaths
American lawyers
People from Tuxedo, New York
19th-century American businesspeople